Heliotropium stenophyllum is a species of plant in the family Boraginaceae. It is endemic to Chile. Its natural habitats are semi-desert coastal areas of Northern Chile, in the 3 and 4 Region.

References
 Chileflora Heliotropium stenophyllum.

stenophyllum
Endemic flora of Chile
Vulnerable plants